Beryl Elizabeth Reid,  (17 June 1919 – 13 October 1996), was a British actress of stage and screen. She won the 1967 Tony Award for Best Actress in a Play for The Killing of Sister George, the 1980 Olivier Award for Best Comedy Performance for Born in the Gardens, and the 1982 BAFTA TV Award for Best Actress for Smiley's People. Her film appearances included The Belles of St. Trinian's (1954), The Killing of Sister George (1968), The Assassination Bureau (1969), and No Sex Please, We're British (1973).

Early life
Born in Hereford in 1919, Reid was the daughter of Scottish parents and grew up in Manchester, where she attended Withington and Levenshulme High Schools. As a child, she established a lifelong friendship with Nancy Wrigley, the daughter of the prominent classical soprano, Dame Isobel Baillie. Years later, Reid fondly recalled how Baillie would "tell us the most wonderful things...you can imagine nine-year old girls goggle-eyed at six princes serenading her in Hawaii!"

Career
Leaving school at 16, she made her debut in 1936 as a music hall performer at the Floral Hall, Bridlington. Before and during the Second World War, she took part in variety shows and pantomimes. She had no formal training but later worked at the National Theatre and the Royal Shakespeare Company. Her first big success came in the BBC radio show Educating Archie as naughty schoolgirl Monica and later as the Brummie, "Marlene."

Her many film and television roles as a character actor were usually well received. She reprised her Tony Award-winning performance of a lesbian soap opera star in The Killing of Sister George for the 1968 screen version and was nominated for the Golden Globe Award for Best Motion Picture Actress in a Drama. The tour of the play was not a success; people in shops refused to serve her and other performers due to the gay characters in the play.

She was the subject of This Is Your Life in 1976 when she was surprised by Eamonn Andrews in the car park of Thames Television's Teddington Studios.

In both Tinker Tailor Soldier Spy (1979) and Smiley's People, (1982) Reid played Connie Sachs. For Smiley's People she won a BAFTA for Best Actress on Television.

Between 1981 and 1983, Reid co-presented the Children's TV programme Get up and Go for Yorkshire Television, her co-presenter "Mooncat" being a green, talking, puppet cat. Stephen Boxer was her human co-star. After she left the show, it became titled simply Mooncat and Co.

Reid wrote an autobiography in 1984, So Much Love.

She played the part of an elderly feminist and political subversive in the 1987 television drama, The Beiderbecke Tapes.

She appeared in many situation comedies and variety programmes on TV including BBC TV's long running music hall show, The Good Old Days.

Personal life and death 
She married twice, but had no children. An authorised biography, Roll Out the Beryl, was published by Fantom Films on 22 August 2016. Written by Kaye Crawford, it was the first biography to be written of the actress and coincided with the twentieth anniversary of her death.

Reid died at the age of 77 from severe osteoarthritis and kidney failure (according to some obituaries, she had developed pneumonia) at a hospital in Wexham, Buckinghamshire on 13 October 1996, after complications following knee replacement surgery for arthritis.

Partial filmography

References

External links

 
 
 

1919 births
1996 deaths
Actresses from Manchester
Best Actress BAFTA Award (television) winners
Deaths from pneumonia in England
English film actresses
English people of Scottish descent
English stage actresses
English television actresses
Officers of the Order of the British Empire
People from Buckinghamshire
People from Hereford
20th-century English actresses
Laurence Olivier Award winners
Tony Award winners
20th-century British businesspeople